The 2022 Bellinzona Ladies Open was a professional tennis tournament played on outdoor clay courts. It was the second edition of the tournament which was part of the 2022 ITF Women's World Tennis Tour. It took place in Bellinzona, Switzerland between 11 and 17 April 2022.

Singles main draw entrants

Seeds

 1 Rankings are as of 4 April 2022.

Other entrants
The following players received wildcards into the singles main draw:
  Alina Granwehr
  Leonie Küng
  Céline Naef
  Sebastianna Scilipoti

The following player received entry using a protected ranking:
  Kathinka von Deichmann

The following players received entry from the qualifying draw:
  Federica Arcidiacono
  Miriam Kolodziejová
  Johana Marková
  Yana Morderger
  Lena Papadakis
  Alice Ramé
  Raluca Șerban
  Natalija Stevanović

Champions

Singles

  Raluca Șerban def.  Ekaterine Gorgodze, 6–3, 6–0

Doubles

  Alicia Barnett /  Olivia Nicholls def.  Xenia Knoll /  Oksana Selekhmeteva, 6–7(7–9), 6–4, [10–7]

References

External links
 2022 Bellinzona Ladies Open at ITFtennis.com
 Official website

2022 ITF Women's World Tennis Tour
2022 in Swiss sport
April 2022 sports events in Switzerland